Max McAuley Power (born 27 July 1993) is an English professional footballer who plays as a midfielder for  club Wigan Athletic. He began his career with Tranmere Rovers and then spent time with Wigan Athletic and Sunderland, making more than 100 Football League appearances with each club, before rejoining Wigan in 2021.

Career

Tranmere Rovers

Early career
Born in Birkenhead, Wirral, Power joined local Tranmere Rovers' youth set-up at the age of eight and captained the club at every age group including the first team. He chose to join the team instead of signing for Liverpool. After impressing in the Tranmere Rovers Reserve team he was awarded a professional contract in May 2011. Manager Les Parry was confident Power had a bright future in the game, but warned the youngster about his aggression. He compared him to Joss Labadie, another young and talented Rovers midfielder with a reputation as a hothead. Power spent time on loan at Colwyn Bay in the 2010–11 season.

2011–12 season
Power made his first team debut in the Football League Trophy clash with Port Vale on 30 August 2011; he replaced Andy Robinson on 66 minutes before he went on to score a penalty in the penalty shootout victory. On 10 September he made his League One debut, starting in a 0–2 defeat away to Huddersfield Town and making way for Labadie after 77 minutes. He ended his first season with four league appearances and two in the Football League Trophy.

2012–13 season
Power scored his first goal for the club on 13 November 2012, concluding a 3–0 win against Braintree Town in the FA Cup first round after coming on for James Wallace. He scored his first league goal for the club on 26 December, as they came from behind to win 2–1 against Crewe Alexandra at Prenton Park. On 4 March, he extended his contract, keeping him at the club until June 2015.

2013–14 season
In the following season, Power scored his first goal on 15 March 2014, equalising in the 15th minute of an eventual 1–2 home defeat by Swindon Town. His only other goal of the campaign was on 12 April, opening a 2–1 home win over Shrewsbury Town; both teams were relegated at the end of the season.

2014–15 season
On 7 October 2014, Power opened the scoring as Tranmere drew 1–1 at home against Carlisle United in the Football League Trophy second round, advancing via a penalty shootout. He scored the only goal in the FA Cup first round against Bristol Rovers on 8 November, converting a penalty after handball by Mark McChrystal. Three days later, he equalised as Tranmere came from behind to win 2–1 at Bury in the quarter-finals of the Football League Trophy.

He opened the scoring in the semi-finals on 9 December, a 2–2 draw against Walsall, and scored in the shootout although his team were knocked out. A week later, Power concluded a 2–1 comeback to defeat Oxford United in an FA Cup second round replay. He again netted in the third round on 3 January 2015, albeit in a 2–6 defeat to Premier League club Swansea City. On his 100th league appearance for Tranmere, he opened the scoring in a 2–1 win away to Cambridge United on 17 March. Tranmere needed to win away at Plymouth Argyle on 25 April to retain their place in The Football League, but Power fouled Dominic Blizzard to concede a penalty which Reuben Reid scored. He equalised from the edge of the penalty area, but his team lost 2–3, and thus were relegated to the Conference, ending a 94-year tenure in the league.

Wigan Athletic
On 3 July 2015, Power signed for Wigan Athletic on a three-year contract. He scored a free-kick in the club's first pre-season match, a 2–1 win against Queen of the South in La Manga Club. On 9 August he played the full 90 minutes as Wigan began the League One season with a 2–0 defeat to Coventry City at the Ricoh Arena. On 26 September, he scored his first goal for Wigan in a 1–1 draw at Oldham Athletic, opening the scoring from 30 yards.

Sunderland
On 9 August 2018, Power signed for Sunderland on loan from Wigan Athletic. During his loan spell, Power received three straight red cards against Oxford United, Bradford City and Walsall, although the latter was rescinded 2 days later. On 2 January 2019, Power's loan to Sunderland became permanent, signing a 2 and a half-year contract. Power also went on to make appearances in both the 2019 EFL Trophy Final and the League One play-off final, suffering defeat in both. Power was named Sunderland's team captain at the beginning of the 2020–21 season. He subsequently lifted the trophy following Sunderland's 1–0 win over Tranmere in the 2021 EFL Trophy Final. On 25 May 2021 it was announced that he would leave Sunderland at the end of the season, following the expiry of his contract.

Return to Wigan Athletic
On 16 June 2021, Power agreed to reunite with manager Leam Richardson ahead of the 2021–22 campaign on a two-year deal. In April 2022 Power picked up his third League One title with Wigan Athletic following a 3–0 victory over Shrewsbury Town.

Personal life
Power attended Wirral Grammar School for Boys, and is named after his parents' pet labrador. He once feared that he was named after Homer Simpson's brief name change in The Simpsons episode "Homer to the Max", before discovering that the episode aired when he was six years old. He has also posed for a motoring magazine which shares his name.

Career statistics

Honours
Wigan Athletic
League One: 2015–16, 2017–18, 2021–22

Sunderland
EFL Trophy: 2020–21; runner-up: 2018–19

References

External links

Profile at the official Tranmere Rovers site

1993 births
Living people
Sportspeople from Birkenhead
English footballers
Association football midfielders
Tranmere Rovers F.C. players
Colwyn Bay F.C. players
Wigan Athletic F.C. players
Sunderland A.F.C. players
English Football League players
People educated at Wirral Grammar School for Boys